Khalid al-Azm (11 June 1903 – 18 November 1965) was a Syrian national leader and five-time interim Prime Minister, as well as Acting President from 4 April to 16 September 1941. He was a member of one of the most prominent political families in Syria, al-Azm (also known as Alazem or Al Azem), and the son of an Ottoman minister of religious affairs.

Career 
He graduated from the University of Damascus in 1923 with a degree in law, and joined the city government in 1925. At this time he also actively ran his family's estates throughout the country. In the 1930s, he became close associates with leading members of the anti-French National Bloc coalition such as future presidents Hashim al-Atassi and Shukri al-Kuwatli. He remained a longtime supporter of the former, but often quarreled with the latter, whom he accused of being too authoritarian. In 1941 the French appointed him Prime Minister and Acting President, having had no success in finding a viable candidate since the resignation of the nationalist Atassi in 1939. However he was replaced 5 months later with a French loyalist, Taj al-Din al-Hasani. Azm served repeatedly in parliament and in the cabinet from 1943 to 1947. He became a focus of opposition when he resigned from the cabinet in 1945 and lead the forces opposed to Kuwatli's drive to amend the constitution to allow himself a second term in office. Kuwatli prevailed, and Azm ran against him in 1947 and lost. However he accepted the position of envoy to France and served in that capacity for a year. He concluded successful arms purchases from France and later from the Soviet Union. In May 1948, Azm agreed to form a multi-party cabinet under Kuwatli which served until March 1949. He allied himself with France and the United States and attempted to obtain loans from them for domestic development. He traveled frequently to attend United Nations assemblies on the Palestinian problem. Azm clashed with members of the military, especially Chief of Staff Husni al-Za'im. The latter launched a coup d'état on 29 March 1949 and imprisoned both Azm and president Kuwatli. When Za'im was overthrown five months later, Azm returned to parliament as deputy for Damascus and became Minister of Finance. He was also elected into the Constituent Assembly that drafted a new constitution for Syria. He became Prime Minister again under Hashim al-Atassi's second administration, in June 1950, heading three cabinets between then and 1951. Azm closed the border to Lebanese goods in an attempt to prevent the crash of domestic Syrian industry due to rampant Lebanese imports. He also clashed repeatedly with the military because he refused to appoint officers in any of his cabinets, and always reserved the defense portfolio for himself. He also clashed with pro-Hashemite elements in Syrian politics that advocated union with Iraq. Socialists distrusted him because of his aristocratic and wealthy Ottoman background. Azm left the public arena from 1951 to 1954 in protest over the coup of Adib al-Shishakli which toppled Atassi's democratic administration.

Opposition to Nasser 
After the deposition of Shishakli, Azm again lost to Kuwatli in the presidential election of 1955. He retired briefly, then reemerged in November 1956 to enter the cabinet of Prime Minister Sabri al-Assali as minister of defense. Azm played a key role in achieving an alliance with the USSR, and traveled there repeatedly to arrange loans, economic pacts and arm sales, angering the United States, where he was nicknamed the "Red Millionaire". This name was even adopted by the Syria Press in the 1950s, although he was not a socialist, and in fact opposed the pre-eminent advocate of state socialism in the Arab World, Egyptian president Gamal Abdel Nasser. He opposed in vain the union with Egypt in 1958 which created the United Arab Republic, arguing that Nasser would destroy Syria's democratic system and free market economy. Azm once again deserted political life during the Union years (1958–1961), and moved to Lebanon.

Military instability 
When the union was dissolved he returned to Syria, helped draft the secessionist document himself, and tried to run for presidential office but his candidacy was thwarted by the military. Nazim al-Kudsi was elected, and Azm returned to parliament as deputy for Damascus. On 28 March 1962, yet another coup toppled the civilian administration, and Kudsi and Azm were both imprisoned. On 2 April a counter coup released them, and Azm became Prime Minister again under Kudsi. The two men allied with former president Kuwatli to rid the army of pro-Nasserist elements, and reverse the austere program of nationalization instituted by Nasser when he was head of the UAR. Before this could be achieved, the socialist Ba'ath Party came to power in Syria in March 1963 and both Azm and Qudsi fled into exile.

Death 
Azm relocated permanently to Beirut, where he lived in difficult financial circumstances, his vast Syrian holdings having been appropriated by the Baathists. There he died and was buried on 18 February 1965. His memoirs were published posthumously in 1973.

References
Sami Moubayed "Steel & Silk: Men and Women Who Shaped Syria 1900–2000" (Cune Press, Seattle, 2005).

Specific

1903 births
1965 deaths
Khalid
Ambassadors of Syria to Belgium
Ambassadors of Syria to France
Ambassadors of Syria to Switzerland
Damascus University alumni
Foreign ministers of Syria
Leaders ousted by a coup
Members of the People's Assembly of Syria
People from Damascus
Presidents of Syria
Prime Ministers of Syria
Syrian ministers of defense
Syrian ministers of finance
Syrian people of Turkish descent
20th-century  Syrian politicians